The 2019 Africa U-23 Cup of Nations was the third edition of the Africa U-23 Cup of Nations, the quadrennial international age-restricted football championship organised by the Confederation of African Football (CAF) for the men's under-23 national teams of Africa. It was hosted by Egypt between 8 and 22 November 2019.

The tournament was initially scheduled to take place in Zambia, but they withdrew from hosting in July 2017. Egypt was announced as the new host nation of the tournament by CAF on 23 September 2017.

Same as previous editions, the tournament served as African qualifying for the Olympic football tournament, with the top three teams of the tournament qualifying for the 2020 Summer Olympic men's football tournament in Japan.

Nigeria were the defending champions, but were eliminated in the group stage. Egypt defeated Ivory Coast 2–1 at extra time in the final, winning the title for the first time in their history, while South Africa came third for the second times in a row after beating Ghana 6–5 on penalties after the match ended 2–2 in their third-place play-off match.

Qualification

Egypt qualified automatically as hosts, while the remaining seven spots were determined by the qualifying rounds.

Qualified teams
The following eight teams qualified for the final tournament.

Venues
The tournament used two venues, Cairo International Stadium and Al Salam Stadium, both in Cairo.

Squads

Each team had to register a squad of 21 players. Only players born on or after 1 January 1997 were eligible to compete in the tournament (Regulations Article 45).

Draw
The draw of the final tournament was held on 2 October 2019, 19:00 CAT (UTC+2), at the Haramlek Palace of Montaza Complex in Alexandria. The eight teams were drawn into two groups of four teams. The hosts Egypt were seeded in Group A (position A1), and the defending champions Nigeria were seeded in Group B (position B1). The remaining teams were allocated to two pots based on the results of the 2015 Africa U-23 Cup of Nations, and were drawn to the remaining positions in their group.

Match officials
On 31 October 2019, CAF released the list of 12 referees and 13 assistant referees selected to oversee matches. This is the first time CAF appointed female match officials for the tournament.

Group stage
The top two teams of each group advanced to the semi-finals.

Tiebreakers
Teams were ranked according to points (3 points for a win, 1 point for a draw, 0 points for a loss), and if tied on points, the following tiebreaking criteria were applied in the order given, to determine the rankings (Regulations Article 68):
Points in head-to-head matches among tied teams;
Goal difference in head-to-head matches among tied teams;
Goals scored in head-to-head matches among tied teams;
If more than two teams are tied and after applying all head-to-head criteria above, a subset of teams are still tied, all head-to-head criteria above are reapplied exclusively to this subset of teams;
Goal difference in all group matches;
Goals scored in all group matches;
Drawing of lots.

All times are local, CAT (UTC+2).

Group A

Group B

Knockout stage
In the knockout stage, extra time and penalty shoot-out were used to decide the winner if necessary, except for the third place match where a direct penalty shoot-out, without extra time, would be used to decide the winner if necessary.

Bracket

Semi-finals
Winners qualified for the 2020 Summer Olympics.

Third place match
Winners qualified for the 2020 Summer Olympics.

Final

Winners

Awards
The following awards were given at the conclusion of the tournament:

Team of the tournament
The team of the tournament was announced by the CAF after the final.

Coach:  Shawky Gharieb

Qualified teams for Summer Olympics
The following three teams from CAF qualified for the 2020 Summer Olympic men's football tournament.

1 Bold indicates champions for that year.

Goalscorers

References

External links
Total U-23 Africa Cup of Nations, CAFonline.com

 
Caf, Men
U-23
2019
2019–20 in Egyptian football
International association football competitions hosted by Egypt
November 2019 sports events in Africa